Tencent Video (also called WeTV outside of China) is a Chinese video streaming website owned by Tencent. The website was launched in April 2011, and is one of China's largest online video platforms. As of October 2022, Tencent Video has 120 million paid subscribers, making it the 4th largest streaming service in the world, after Netflix, Amazon Prime Video, and Disney+. Tencent Video also operates an international version, WeTV, which was launched in 2018.

History 
In April 2011, Tencent Video officially launched with an independent domain. Tencent Video supports online Video-on-Demand, television broadcasts, and in July 2017 began featuring video content on China's biggest television maker, TCL.

Usage 
In October 2017, Tencent Video's revenue was CNY 65.2 billion (US$9.87 billion). In September 2017, Tencent Video was one of eight Chinese apps in the top 30 mobile apps with the largest revenue in the App Store and Google Play Stores. In October 2017, Tencent Video ranked along the top 15 apps with the largest global consolidated monthly income with Tencent Video ranked top in revenue of iOS entertainment applications in China in October 2017.

Censorship 
Tencent's relationship with the Chinese government has stirred controversy, as content produced or distributed by the platform is subject to censorship with high levels of surveillance.

Events 
June 2011, the Tencent Video documentary channel was officially launched.
August 2012, Tencent Video reached 200 million daily average broadcasts.
April 17, 2013, Tencent Video's first British drama "Happy Lovers" (Coupling) was independently broadcast on their website.
April 27, 2013, Tencent Video reached an agreement with six major production companies including BBC Worldwide, ITV Studios, Fremantle Media, All3Media International, and Endemol.
June 3, 2013, Tencent Video's British TV channel was launched, which was China's first British drama broadcast platform.
 April 27, 2022, Disney China announced that "迪家影视俱乐部" (literal translation Disney+ Film and Television Club) will be launched on Tencent Video, providing Disney's movies, children's animation series and documentaries.

See also 
 List of Tencent Video original programming
 iflix
 Showmax

References

External links

 
 
 WeTV Indonesia

Tencent
2011 establishments in China
Chinese entertainment websites
Video on demand services